The Kills are an indie rock band.

The Kills or Kills may also refer to:
 
 The Kills (novel), by Richard House, 2013
 The Kills, a 2004 novel by Linda Fairstein
 Kills (mixtape), by jj, 2010

See also
 The Kill (disambiguation)
 Kill (disambiguation)